The Bille Brown Theatre is a 351-seat theatre at 78 Montague Road, South Brisbane, Brisbane, Queensland, Australia. The theatre is a corner-stage with raked seating on three sides. It is the main venue for Queensland Theatre.

It reopened in October 2018 after a $5.5 million renovation which converted it from the former 228-seat Bille Brown Studio.

References

Theatres in Brisbane
South Brisbane, Queensland